Chai Sathan may refer to:

 Chai Sathan, Mueang Nan, Nan Province
 Chai Sathan, Saraphi, Chiang Mai Province